Hippotomadae or Hippotomadai was a deme of ancient Attica, of the phyle Oeneis, and between 307/6 BCE and 201/200 BCE of Demetrias, sending one delegate to the Athenian Boule.

Its site is unlocated.

References

Populated places in ancient Attica
Former populated places in Greece
Demoi
Lost ancient cities and towns